Chyorny Mys (lit. black cape) is a rural locality (a selo) in Komsomolsky District of Khabarovsk Krai, Russia. Population: 200 (2011 est.).

It was the furthest operational point of a branch railway from Selikhino built in the early 1950s by the Soviet Union under Joseph Stalin, intended to link to a tunnel to the island of Sakhalin. Construction of the tunnel was abandoned after Stalin's death; however, the section as far as Chyorny Mys had been completed and was kept open for logging industry traffic until the 1990s.

References

Rural localities in Khabarovsk Krai